Alexander Alexeyevich Agin (Russian: Алекса́ндр Алексе́евич А́гин; 11 May 1817, Pskov Governorate - 1875, Kachanivka) was a Russian painter, illustrator and draftsman.

Biography 
He was the illegitimate son of a serf and a retired Rittmeister named Alexei Petrovich Yelagin. Due to that status, his surname was shortened to "Agin".

Upon graduation, he was certified as a drawing teacher at the secondary school level.

From 1844 to 1845, he illustrated the Old Testament and, in 1849, designed reliefs for the monument to Ivan Krylov in Saint Petersburg; sculpted by Peter Clodt von Jürgensburg.  

In 1853, due to issues involving censorship, he moved to Kiev, where he taught drawing at the  school and created props for the Berger Theater (a forerunner to the National Opera of Ukraine).

He was one of the founders of modern Russian illustration; providing images for the works of Yevgeny Grebyonka, Ivan Panaev, Ivan Turgenev, Mikhail Lermontov and Alexander Pushkin as well as for numerous periodicals. He is, perhaps, best-known for the 104 drawings he created for Dead Souls by Nikolai Gogol; which were turned into woodcuts by his collaborator, . They were also engraved by one of Bernardsky's students, Fyodor Bronnikov. They have been reissued on several occasions.

References

Further reading 
 Агин, Александр Алексеевич from the Russian Biographical Dictionary @ Russian WikiSource
 
 Агин, Александр Алексеевич // Dictionary of Russian Artists, Nikolai Sobko (Ed.), 1893 pgs. 36—39.
Brunson, Molly. “Gogol Country.” Comparative literature. 69.4 (2017): 370–393.

External links 

 Biography and works @ LiveInternet
 Biography @ Staratel
 Biography @ The World of Pskov

1817 births
1875 deaths
People from Novorzhevsky Uyezd
Artists from the Russian Empire
Illustrators from the Russian Empire
Designers from the Russian Empire
Imperial Academy of Arts alumni